Ashok Banthia, sometimes referred as Ashok Bathia or Ashok Bhatia, is an Indian actor and director associated with Hindi film, television and theatre actor. He is a  NSD (National School of Drama) alumnus known for his roles in Australian TV miniseries Bodyline as Nawab of Pataudi Sr.

Career 
As he finished his courses at NIDA, he received an offer to work with Kennedy Miller's serial Bodyline, where he played the role of Indian cricketer Nawab of Pataudi Sr. He also did a role in Peter Morhan's English film The Peacock Spring, the French film Indian Orchid, and Hindi films. He recently has appeared in a film Atrangi Re.

Filmography (incomplete) 

Ashok Bantia also played in Mahabharata as Maharaj Chitravat and Kritaverma.

Television (incomplete)

Theatre

Other credits

References

External links 
 

Year of birth missing (living people)
Living people
Indian male film actors
Actors in Hindi cinema
Hindi-language film directors
Indian male stage actors